Lukoyanikha is a rural locality (a village) in Volosatovskoye Rural Settlement, Selivanovsky District, Vladimir Oblast, Russia. The population was 13 as of 2010.

Geography 
Lukoyanikha is located 20 km northwest of Krasnaya Gorbatka (the district's administrative centre) by road. Novy Byt is the nearest rural locality.

References 

Rural localities in Selivanovsky District